This is a list of countries by total energy consumption per capita. This is not the consumption of end-users but all energy needed as input to produce fuel and electricity for end-users. It is known as total primary energy supply (TPES), a term used to indicate the sum of production and imports subtracting exports and storage changes (see also Worldwide energy supply). 
Numbers are from The World Bank - World Development Indicators.

The data are given in kilograms of oil equivalent per year, and gigajoules per year, and in watts, as average equivalent power.
Notes on conversions 
 1 kg of oil equivalent (kgoe) = 11.63 kWh or 1 kWh = 0.08598 kgoe
 1000 kgoe = 42 GJ
 1 GJ/a = 31.7 W average
 1 W average = 8.76 kWh per year (365 × 24 Wh per year)

See also 
 List of countries by carbon dioxide emissions per capita
 List of countries by energy intensity
 List of countries by renewable electricity production
 European countries by fossil fuel use (% of total energy)
 European countries by electricity consumption per person

References 

 
Energy consumption
Energy consumption